Lilian Bryner (born 21 April 1959) is a racing driver from Switzerland.

Career 
She has mainly raced in the FIA GT Championship from 1997 until 2005 and has raced in the 24 Hours of Le Mans.  Her first race at Le Mans was in 1993, but her most successful was finishing second in the GT2 class with Ecurie Biennoise and ninth overall in 1994. In 1995 she joined Stadler Motorsport but in the 1995 24 Hours of Le Mans her #79 Porsche 911 GT2 retired completing 81 laps. In the same year she entered in the BPR Global GT Series and finished 3rd in the standings taking only one podium.

She did not race at Le Mans until 1997 where she once again retired completing 98 laps.  That year she raced with Stadler Motorsport in the inaugural FIA GT season but only three times and picking up the only two points the team got in their class due to the domination of Oreca.

In 1998 she raced in the 1998 International Sports Racing Series season with Autosport Racing until 1999 where she took two podiums before joining BMS Scuderia Italia for the 2001 FIA Sportscar Championship season picking up 50 points and two podiums.

Her first full season in FIA GT Championship was in 2003 when she raced with Care Racing. She took one pole position and six podiums helping Care Racing and their Ferrari 550 Maranello to third place in the championship. In the 2004 FIA GT Championship season she joined BMS Scuderia Italia and took two wins that season, including the 24 Hours of Spa, and five podiums.

Her final season in FIA GT Championship was in 2005 where she only raced three times with Larbre Competition.

References

External links 
 

Swiss racing drivers
1959 births
FIA GT Championship drivers
24 Hours of Le Mans drivers
Living people
Porsche Supercup drivers
24 Hours of Spa drivers
24 Hours of Daytona drivers
Swiss female racing drivers
Larbre Compétition drivers